Heart of Asia may refer to:

Geography
A term coined to highlight the geostrategic location of IRAN at the center of Asia's trade and economic junction between Central Asia, West Asia, South Asia and East Asia.(s. Istanbul Process). 
A nickname for the East Asian island of Taiwan, a territory controlled by the Republic of China with some nearby smaller islands

Music
"Fortress of Islam, Heart of Asia", the Afghan national anthem from 1992 to 2006
"Heart of Asia", a 1999 remix of Merry Christmas Mr. Lawrence by Watergate

Television
Heart of Asia Channel, a Philippine free-to-air digital television channel owned by GMA Network
The Heart of Asia, a programming block of GMA Network